The Royal-Quebec Golf Club (French: Club de Golf Royal Québec) is a golf course founded in 1874 in Boischatel by members of the local business community, mainly Scots-Quebecers bankers and businessmen.

Located approximately 12 miles (18 km) east of Quebec City near Montmorency Falls, it has been a semi-private club since 1925. One of the oldest golf clubs in North America, the current 36-hole facility is located on a 186 hectare piece of land with pine trees that have been growing since the club was founded.  The club house, by the 18th green of the "Quebec" course, overlooks l'Île d'Orléans and Quebec City.

Notable members 
 Tommy Bolt
 Billy Casper
 Jimmy Demaret
 Dow Finsterwald
 Lionel Fleury
 Doug Ford
 Stan Leonard
 Gene Littler
 Jonathan Marchessault
 Arnold Palmer
 Patrick Roy
 Sam Snead
 Frank Stranahan
 Lee Trevino
 Art Wall Jr.

See also 
 List of Canadian organizations with royal patronage
 List of golf clubs granted Royal status
 List of golf courses in Quebec

References

External links 
 

Golf clubs and courses in Quebec
Organizations based in Canada with royal patronage
1874 establishments in Quebec
Royal golf clubs